Barry Asher (born July 14, 1946) was an American professional bowler on the PBA Tour (1966–76).

Biography
Asher, who is Jewish, was born in Los Angeles, California.  His bowling average was 170 when he was 10 years old, 180 the next year, and over 200 at age 14. He attended Santa Ana High School and Santa Ana Junior College, and was an All-American in 1972–73.  He won his first Professional Bowlers Association (PBA) title at the age of 19 in 1966.

He averaged 247 on his way to winning the 1971 South Bend (Indiana) Open, setting a new PBA scoring record. In 1976, his final year on the tour, Asher became the 15th bowler to win 10 PBA titles.  He also won four titles in the American Bowling Congress (ABC) national tournament.  He was named Senior Bowler of the Year three times.

He was the bowling technical advisor for the film The Big Lebowski (1998) and bowled in the final scene.

In 2008, the PBA announced the 50 Greatest Players in association's history, Asher was one of the 50.

Halls of Fame
Asher was inducted into the USBC Hall of Fame in 1998, Asher was inducted into the PBA Hall of Fame in 1988, and into the Orange County Bowling Hall of Fame and the Southern California Bowling Hall of Fame.  He is also a member of the Jewish Sports Hall of Fame (1990) and the Southern California Jewish Sports Hall of Fame (2000).

See also
List of select Jewish bowlers

References

External links
Barry Asher, PBA bio

American ten-pin bowling players
1946 births
Sportspeople from Anaheim, California
Living people
Jewish American sportspeople
21st-century American Jews